Gerry Bell may refer to:

Gerry Bell (weather forecaster), see 2012 Atlantic hurricane season
Gerry Bell (ice hockey), played in Amarillo Wranglers (1975–77)

See also
Jerry Bell (disambiguation)
Jeremy Bell (disambiguation)
Gerard Bell, actor, see Bryony Lavery
Gerald Bell, flying ace
Jerome Bell, singer